George Constantin (3 May 1933 – 30 April 1994) was a Romanian actor. He appeared in more than fifty films from 1960 to 1994.

Selected filmography

References

External links 
Biography

1933 births
1994 deaths
Romanian male film actors
Male actors from Bucharest
Burials at Bellu Cemetery